The Mark 8 nuclear bomb was an American  nuclear bomb, designed in the late 1940s and early 1950s, which was in service from 1952 to 1957.

Description 

The Mark 8 was a gun-type nuclear bomb, which rapidly assembles several critical masses of fissile nuclear material by firing a fissile projectile or "bullet" over and around a fissile "target", using a system which closely resembles a medium-sized cannon barrel and propellant.

The Mark 8 was an early earth-penetrating bomb (see nuclear bunker buster), intended to dig into the earth some distance prior to detonating.

A total of 40 Mark 8 bombs were produced.

The Mark 8 was succeeded by an improved variant, the Mark 11 nuclear bomb.

Variants
The Mark 8 was considered as a cratering warhead for the SSM-N-8 Regulus cruise missile.  This W8 variant was cancelled in 1955.

A lighter Mark 8 variant, the Mark 10 nuclear bomb, was developed as a lightweight airburst (surface target) bomb.  The Mark 10 project was cancelled prior to introduction into service, replaced by the much more fissile-material-efficient Mark 12 nuclear bomb implosion design.

See also
 List of nuclear weapons
 Mark 1 Little Boy nuclear bomb

References

External links
 Allbombs.html list of all US nuclear warheads at nuclearweaponarchive.org
 

Mark 08
Gun-type nuclear bombs
Nuclear bombs of the United States
Military equipment introduced in the 1950s